The Wilson River language, also known as "Modern" Wankumara (Wangkumara/ Wanggumara), is an Australian Aboriginal language of the Karnic family. It was spoken by several peoples along the Wilson River in Queensland. Of these, the Wanggumara (Wangkumara) and Galali may have migrated from the Bulloo River and abandoned their language when they arrived. (See Bulloo River language.)

Speakers

In 1981, the language was still spoken by four members of the Wangkumara community around Cooper Creek, the Thomson River, and the Warry Warry Creek, the town of Eromanga and the Nuccundra. It appears to have gone extinct by 2005.

Varieties
Dixon (2002) considers Punthamara to be a dialect of Wangkumara, Bowern (2001) as very close. Bowern says that Ngandangara also appears to have been "very close", although data is too poor for a proper classification. Karenggapa is either a dialect or an alternative name. (McDonald & Wurm 1979) note that Wilson River Galali, what they call "Waŋkumara (Gaḷali)", is very close to modern Waŋkumara and Bundamara.

Breen (1967) states that the (Karnic) speech of the groups along the Wilson River are essentially identical. These include Bundhamara, Gungadudji, 'Modern' Wanggumara and Ngandangura. For instance, that Gungadidji is 'almost identical to Punthamara and modern Wangkumara'. Nonetheless, these language varieties have been assigned individual ISO codes.

Mambangura (the language of the Thereila) may have belonged as well. At least, the Yandruwandha term Palpakunu covered it as well as the other Wilson River dialects.

A language labeled "Wonkomarra" in Myles (1886) is a different language from modern Wangkumara, and may be a variety of Kalali.

Features
Wangkumara is notable for being a language with a tripartite verbal alignment. Wurm's Wankamara (Galali) is entirely suffixing and morphologically fairly simple having the following word classes: nominal (noun and pronoun), verb, particle, and interjection. The word order is random and free. The phonemes consist of three vowels and 26 consonants.

References

External links
Verb compounding in central Australian languages.
Bibliography of Bundhamara people and language resources, at the Australian Institute of Aboriginal and Torres Strait Islander Studies

Karnic languages
Extinct languages of Queensland
Critically endangered languages